Dhunni is a village in Kharian Tehsil, Gujrat District in the Punjab province of Pakistan. It is part of Kharian Tehsil.

The word Dhunni is derived from word Dhooni (as shown in old documents paper in land registration office Dhunni). Dhooni means to blow fire Punjabi. There are other two village named Dhunni. The first is Dhunni at Hafizabad  and other is Dhunni Kalan at Mandi Bahauddin. Dhunni is place of shrine of Pir of Hujra Shah Muqeem named Pir Imam Ali Shah and Pir Mubarak Ali Shah. Also known as Dam Meeram Lal Pak Bahawal Sher Qalandar.

Small town millu brothers mohallah & Name Ali Akbar kaluni is part of Dhunni residents of village are Syed Shaukat shah Syed Ijaz shah syed Abbas shah total number of house are 14.

Education
Hayat Public School Dhunni
Govt high school dhunni.
Govt primary school dhunni.
Minhaj ul Quran school Dhunni

Mosques
Masjid usman e ghani shumali mahallah
Masjid shumali mahallah
Jamia Masjid Hazrat Imam Hussain
Jamia Masjid Hazrat Ali
Masjid Al noor Dhunni adda
Masjid syed pak
Jamia Masjid of deoband
 Imam Bargah Gulistan-e-Abu Talib 
There are approximately 14 Mosques in this village

Shrine
Darba e Alia Pir Imam ali shah and Pir Mubarak ali shah Gilani
Darbar Pir Baba Hanif Shah
Darbar saeed pak

Masajids of Ahel e Sunnat wal jamat
Khankah Baba Abdul Nabi Sahib

Bank
Habib Bank Limited, Dhunni

Welfare and religion
overseas welfare society dhunni.
Sunni Islam
Mughlia Welfare Society
Anjuman Ghulaman-e-Qamar Bani Hashemi

Sports
Dhunni cricket team
Dhunni pigeon flying club
Gujjar kabbadi club Dhunni -Ch Amjad Ali Naja Meelu

References
Tehsils & Unions in the District of Gujrat - Government of Pakistan
official website

Union councils of Gujrat District
Populated places in Gujrat District